James McColley House is a historic home located at Milford in Kent County, Delaware.  It is a two-story, five bay, brick and frame dwelling in two sections. The brick section is the older section and dates to about 1790. It is in the full Georgian plan. Sometime during the second quarter of the 19th century, the house was changed to a Victorian Gothic Revival style.  The house has a double entrance door and cross-gable roof with box cornice and decorative brackets.

It was listed on the National Register of Historic Places in 1983.

References

Houses on the National Register of Historic Places in Delaware
Georgian architecture in Delaware
Gothic Revival architecture in Delaware
Houses in Milford, Delaware
Houses in Kent County, Delaware
National Register of Historic Places in Kent County, Delaware
Individually listed contributing properties to historic districts on the National Register in Delaware